Annoying Orange is a comedy series.

Annoying Orange may also refer to:
The High Fructose Adventures of Annoying Orange, a television series
Annoying Orange: Kitchen Carnage, a video game developed by Thruster Games
List of Annoying Orange episodes, a list of "Annoying Orange" episodes